is a 1994 Japan-exclusive Super Famicom Formula One arcade racing video game licensed (and also supervised) by Satoru Nakajima and by FOCA to Fuji Television. This was the sequel to Super F1 Hero and the last game ever endorsed by Nakajima.

Summary
The game is all in the Japanese language. All teams and circuits of the 1994 Formula One season are represented.  Note because of the tragic circumstances at Imola during the season, the game reflects the drivers of the season (for example, David Coulthard, who was the replacement driver for Williams after the tragic circumstances, is in the Williams). During the racing, the player can choose five type of views, from top-down perspective (similar to F-1 Grand Prix) to 3D polygon-based (similar to F1 Pole Position).

Images

Circuits

See also
 Satoru Nakajima F-1 Hero GB World Championship '91

References

1994 video games
Formula One video games
Japan-exclusive video games
Satoru Nakajima video games
Super Nintendo Entertainment System games
Super Nintendo Entertainment System-only games
Varie games
Video games set in 1994
Video game sequels
Video games developed in Japan